The Libera Award for Record of the Year (known as Album of the Year prior to 2021) is an award presented by the American Association of Independent Music at the annual Libera Award which recognizes "best album released commercially in the United States by an independent label" since 2012.

Winners and nominees

Artists with multiple wins
2 wins
Alabama Shakes

Artists with multiple nominations
3 nominations
Run the Jewels

2 nominations
Alabama Shakes
Beach House
Bon Iver
Father John Misty
Kamasi Washington
Thundercat
Yves Tumor

References

External links

Record of the Year
Album awards